Boualem Sansal (born 15 October 1949) is an Algerian author. In 2012, he was named winner of the Prix du roman arabe, but the prize money was withdrawn due to Sansal's visit to Israel to speak at the Jerusalem Writers Festival.

Biography 
Boualem Sansal was born in Théniet El Had, Tissemsilt. Trained as an engineer with a doctorate in economics, he began writing novels at the age of 50 after retiring from his job as a high-ranking official in the Algerian government. The assassination of President Mohamed Boudiaf in 1992 and the rise of Islamic fundamentalism in Algeria inspired him to write about his country. Sansal continues to live with his wife and two daughters in Algeria despite the controversy his books have aroused in his homeland. At the 2007 International Festival of Literature in Berlin, he was introduced as a writer "exiled in his own country. " He claims that Algeria is becoming a bastion of Islamic extremism and the country is losing its intellectual and moral underpinnings.

Choices, topics, impact
Sansal writes in French.

Poste restante: Alger (2006 essay)
Since the publication of Poste restante: Alger. Lettre de colère et d'espoir à mes compatriotes in 2006, Sansal's books have been banned in Algeria.

Le village de l'Allemand (2008 novel)
Sansal's 2008 novel Le village de l'Allemand ou le journal des frères Schiller, is the story of two Algerian brothers who burrow into the past and discover that their father had been a Nazi officer who fled to Algeria after the war. The book explores the fine line between Islamic fundamentalism and Nazism. Le Village de l'allemand is the first of Sansal's novels to be translated into English, and was published in the US in September 2009 as The German Mujahid and in the UK as An Unfinished Business.

The novel follows the unique journey that brothers Malrich and Rachel Schiller individually took in discovering the dark past of their late father, a former SS officer, who was the responsible for the deaths of countless Jews during the Holocaust. Although the story is fictional, Sansal incorporates many historical events to create a very realistic backdrop. The most significant events Sansal addresses include the end of World War II, the Holocaust, the Algerian War of Independence, and the rise of Islamic Fundamentalism within France. The novel is found to be very controversial because the destructive power of Nazi Germany during World War II is compared to that of Islamic Fundamentalists in Europe after the war. The narrative suggests various themes including the impact of both guilt and violence, the glorification of oppressors, and how the burden of one person's sins can be felt by others. It addresses how knowledge regarding the significance of the Holocaust is understood and misunderstood in vastly different ways around the world. Furthermore, Boualem Sansal highlights the fact that there is very little known about National Socialism in the Arab world. National Socialism was the political ideology of the Nazi Party. The novel suggests that generations which follow World War II and, more specifically, the Holocaust, have a responsibility to educate themselves on the matter using whatever resources are available to them. People also must spread that knowledge to those who cannot access it themselves in order to ensure that such a terrible genocide never occurs again. The benefit to history is that we, as human beings, can learn from the mistakes of the past in order to make better decisions in the future. Sansal's story proves that individuals can have incredible impacts on improving the lives of others and protecting their communities. It does not take an army to enact change-or rather, it should not take an army to enact positive change.

Awards and critical acclaim
Sansal's work has won top literary awards in France, among them the Prix du Premier Roman in 1999 for his debut novel, Le serment des Barbares (Gallimard, 1999), which has since been made into a film based on a screenplay by Jorge Semprún.

On 16 October 2011 Sansal received the Peace Prize of the German Book Trade. On 19 December 2011, he was announced as being on the jury for the 62nd Berlin International Film Festival, scheduled to be held in February 2012.

Sansal was the recipient of the 2012 Editions Gallimard Arabic Novel prize for his book "Rue Darwin." The prize is awarded by the Arab Ambassadors Council, based in Paris. However, after the Council learned that Sansal had attended the Jerusalem Writers Festival earlier in the year, they revoked the 15,000 euros prize money he had been slated to receive. Commenting on the decision to withdraw the prize money, Sansal said it was "completely unacceptable", adding that Arab countries – and his home country, Algeria, in particular – had "shut themselves in a prison of intolerance". France Culture radio director and head of the jury that awarded the prize, Olivier Poivre d'Avror, said before resigning his post in protest, the prize money had been withdrawn as a "sordid" consequence of Hamas pressure. "Between being nominated for the prize and actually receiving it, Boualem Sansal visited Israel … Hamas immediately issued a statement calling his presence an act of treason against the Palestinians. The reaction of Arab Ambassadors Council was a direct result of this." A spokeswoman for the Arab Ambassadors Council claimed the council's decision had not been influenced by the Hamas statement on the matter. Israeli Foreign Minister Avigdor Lieberman urged the international community to denounce the boycott against Sansal.

Sansal said he does not regret visiting Israel, stating, "I am glad I visited Israel and returned with great happiness."  Sansal also said that "Israelis have all the reasons in the world to be proud of what they have achieved in their country in such a short period of time...In so many fields, Israel is at the international forefront and it is very impressive."  Sansal also said that he was moved by Lieberman's support, and, "His statement was so gracious in comparison to Arab governments. He told them: 'You're persecuting intellectuals. We embrace them and care for their safety. That is why your citizens are rebelling against you.' That is a harsh blow to Arab governments."  Sansal criticized Hamas as well, saying that it was a terrorist movement that "has taken Gazans hostage. It has taken Islam hostage."

Sansal was awarded the 2015 Grand Prix du roman de l'Académie française for his novel 2084: la fin du monde.

Published work

Novels 
 1999: Le Serment des barbares, Gallimard. Prix du Premier Roman 1999. Prix Tropiques, AFD, 1999 
 2000: L'Enfant fou de l'arbre creux, Gallimard. Prix Michel Dard
 2003: Dis-moi le paradis, Gallimard
 2005: Harraga, Gallimard. English edition, 2014 by Bloomsbury, translated by Frank Wynne 
 2008: Le village de l'Allemand ou le journal des frères Schiller, Gallimard. Grand prix RTL-Lire 2008, Grand prix de la francophonie bestowed by the Académie française 2008 -Prix Nessim Habif- (Académie royale de langue et de littérature françaises de Belgique). translated by Frank Wynne and published in the US as The German Mujahid (2009) and in the UK as An Unfinished Business
 2011: Rue Darwin, Gallimard
 2015: 2084: La fin du monde, Gallimard. Grand Prix du roman de l'Académie française
 2018: Le Train d'Erlingen ou la Métamorphose de Dieu, Gallimard
 2021: Lettre d’amitié, de respect et de mise en garde aux peuples et aux nations de la terre, Gallimard

Short stories 
 2001: La voix, Gallimard-Le Monde
 2005: La vérité est dans nos amours perdues, in "Des nouvelles d'Algérie", ed Métailié
 2004: La Femme sans nom. Littera et l'Aube.
 2005: Homme simple cherche évènement heureux, Le Monde.
 2005: Tous les bonheurs ne valent pas le déplacement, Magazine des Beaux Arts.
 2006: La Terrible nouvelle. Le Monde.

Essays 
 2006: Poste restante: Alger, lettre de colère et d'espoir à mes compatriotes, Gallimard
 2007: Petit éloge de la mémoire, Gallimard

Technical literature 
1986: La Combustion dans les turboréacteurs, OPU, Alger.
1989: La Mesure de la productivité, OPU, Alger

References

External links
 Haaretz weekend magazine interview with Sansal publish on October 5, 2012 
 Interview with the Algerian Novelist Boualem Sansal: "There Are Parallels between Islamism and National Socialism"
 German Peace Prize for Boualem Sansal: A Good, Cowardly Choice

Algerian writers in French
People from Algiers
1949 births
Living people
Télécom Paris alumni
Algerian atheists
Former Muslim critics of Islam
Critics of Islam
Grand Prix du roman de l'Académie française winners
Prix Louis Guilloux winners
Chevaliers of the Ordre des Arts et des Lettres
Anti-Islam sentiment in Africa
Algerian Zionists
21st-century Algerian people